Mike Gent (born September 17, 1971 in New Jersey, United States) is an American songwriter, guitarist, and vocalist in The Figgs, in which he has performed since 1987. Gent grew up in Saratoga Springs, NY and attended Saratoga Springs High School. Gent also played with Graham Parker and Candy Butchers.

Solo discography
1999 Received
2003 The Intake
2009 Mike Gent
2013 Long After Stan
2013 The Rapid Steve
2017 Headphone Music
2020 Singles 2018
2020 Archives Vol.1 - NYC 1997/1998

The Figgs discography
 1992 Ginger (Cassette/LP/CD) - Absolute A Go Go / Peterwalkee / Stomper
 1993 Ready Steady Stoned (Cassette) - Absolute A Go Go 
 1994 Low-Fi At Society High (CD/LP/Cassette) - Imago 
 1994 Hi-Fi Dropouts (CD) - Imago
 1996 Banda Macho (CD/LP/Cassette) - Capitol Records 
 1998 The Figgs Couldn't Get High (CD/LP) - Absolute A Go Go/Stomper
 1997 The Last Rock'N'Roll Tour (CD) - Bloodshot Records w/Graham Parker
 1999 For EP Fans Only (CD) - Hearbox 
 2000 Rejects (LP) - Philthyrex 
 2000 Sucking In Stereo (CD/LP) - Hearbox/Peterwalkee/Stomper 
 2001 Badger (CD) - Hearbox
 2002 Slow Charm (CD) - Hearbox 
 2003 Ready Steady Stoned (CD Deluxe Reissue) - Stomper/Sodapop 
 2003 Official Bootleg: Live Cuts From Somewhere (CD) - UpYours Records w/Graham Parker
 2004 Palais (CD/LP) - Stomper/Sodapop/Redeye/Soo Intense
 2005 Songs Of No Consequence (CD) - Bloodshot Records w/Graham Parker
 2005 Continue To Enjoy The Figgs Vol. 1 (CD) - Stomper 
 2006 103° In June: Live In Chicago (CD) - Bloodshot Records w/Graham Parker
 2006 Follow Jean Through The Sea (CD/LP) - Gern Blandsten 
 2007 Continue To Enjoy The Figgs Vol. 2 (CD) - Stomper
 2010 The Man Who Fights Himself (CD/LP) - Stomper
 2010 3.28.01 Kansas City, MO - The Hurricane (CD/LP) - Stomper/Peterwalkee 
 2010 Live At FTC (CD/DVD) - Image Entertainment w/Graham Parker
 2012 The Day Gravity Stopped (CD/LP) - Stomper/Peterwalkee 
 2013 1000 People Grinning: The Figgs Anthology (CD) - Stomper
 2013 Three For The Price Of Three! (LP Box Set) - Good Land/Stomper
 2014 Badger LP (LP) - Stomper 
 2015 Other Planes Of Here (CD/LP) - Stomper 
 2016 On The Slide (CD/LP) - Stomper
 2019 Shady Grove (CD/LP) - Stomper
 2022 Chemical Shake (CD/LP) - Stomper

The Gentlemen
 2000 Ladies And Gentlemen...The Gentlemen (CD) - Hearbox/Q Division 
 2002 Blondes Prefer The Gentlemen (CD) - Sodapop/TGRC 
 2005 Brass City Band (CD) - TGRC

References

1971 births
Songwriters from New Jersey
Living people
People from Saratoga Springs, New York
Songwriters from New York (state)
The Figgs members